Cambodia competed at the 2015 World Championships in Athletics in Beijing, China, from 22–30 August 2015.

Results
(q – qualified, NM – no mark, SB – season best)

Men
Track and road events

Sources 

Nations at the 2015 World Championships in Athletics
World Championships in Athletics
Cambodia at the World Championships in Athletics